Triangle is a 2014 South Korean television series, starring Lee Beom-soo, Kim Jae-joong and Im Si-wan. It aired on MBC from May 5 to July 29, 2014 on Mondays and Tuesdays at 22:00 for 26 episodes. Triangle was directed by Yoo Cheol-yong and written by Choi Wan-kyu, who previously collaborated on the gambling dramas All In (2003) and Swallow the Sun (2009).
 
Separated in childhood by unfortunate circumstances, three brothers meet twenty years later, unaware of their connection to each other.

The drama achieved both domestic and international success, ranking among the most watched-dramas during its run in South Korea and its rights being sold interantionally to multiple Asian countries.

Plot
Jang Dong-soo, Jang Dong-chul and Jang Dong-woo are three brothers who got separated at a young age after their father died and their mother left them. They meet again twenty years later, but unaware of their blood ties, their ill-fated paths converge on casino territory where they find themselves at odds with each other.

Eldest brother Jang Dong-soo (Lee Beom-soo) followed in the footsteps of his father and became a detective. His greatest hope is to find his two brothers again and for the siblings to finally be reunited. Due to their different approaches to crime solving, Dong-soo clashes with Hwang Shin-hye (Oh Yeon-soo), a profiler who recently returned to Korea after studying overseas. They eventually gain a mutual respect for each other as colleagues, but find themselves in conflict once again when they learn that the gangster they're after is Dong-soo's own brother, Dong-chul.

Middle brother Jang Dong-chul (Kim Jae-joong) grew up as a petty thug on the streets, using his fists and wits to survive until he climbs to the top of a crime syndicate. Now a gang boss, he conceals his real identity and uses the name Heo Young-dal.

Youngest brother Jang Dong-woo (Im Si-wan) was adopted by a rich chaebol family, and now under the name Yoon Yang-ha, is being groomed as the heir to a casino empire. With no memory of his biological family and raised believing that the world revolves around money, Yang-ha is cynical and cold-hearted. Until he meets Oh Jung-hee (Baek Jin-hee), a poor girl supporting her family by working as a casino dealer, who changes the way Yang-ha sees the world. But he has a rival for her heart, Heo Young-dal. After losing a high-stakes game of Texas hold 'em to Young-dal, Yang-ha becomes furious and lands both Young-dal and Dong-soo in jail. Upon release, the two decide to embark on a mission to get revenge on everyone who has wronged them, including Dong-woo's father, Yoon Tae-joon, the CEO of Daejung group and Go Bok-Tae, the gang boss who helped Yang-ha put Young-dal in jail.

Cast

Main characters
Lee Beom-soo as Jang Dong-soo
Noh Young-hak as young Dong-soo
Kim Jae-joong as Jang Dong-chul / Heo Young-dal
Im Si-wan as Jang Dong-woo / Yoon Yang-ha
Oh Yeon-soo as Hwang Shin-hye
Kim So-hyun as young Shin-hye
Baek Jin-hee as Oh Jung-hee

Supporting characters
Park Ji-yeon as Sung Yoo-jin (episode 15 onwards)
Kang Shin-il as Hwang Jung-man
Jang Dong-jik as Hyun Pil-sang
Kim Byung-ki as Chairman Yoon Tae-joon
Hong Seok-cheon as Man-kang
Lee Yoon-mi as Madam Jang
Shin Seung-hwan as Yang Jang-soo
Shorry J as Jerry
Im Ha-ryong as Yang Man-choon
Kim Ji-young as Jung-hee's grandmother
Kim Joo-yeob as Oh Byung-tae
Park Min-soo as Oh Byung-soo
Jung Ji-yoon as Kang Hyun-mi
Jo Won-hee as Kang Chul-min
Wi Yang-ho as Tak Jae-geol
Park Hyo-joo as Kang Jin
Son Ji-hoon as Detective Lee
Im Ki-hyuk as Detective Min
Kim Byeong-ok as Go Bok-tae
Jo Sung-hyun as Kim Sang-moo
Yeo Ho-min as Gong Soo-chang
Jung Kyung-soon as Mrs. Paju
Naya as Lee Soo-jung
Baek Shin as Detective Gook
Park Won-sook as Heo Choon-hee
Choo Sung-hoon as gang enforcer (cameo)
 Choi Deok-moon as Jang Jeong-gook

Episodes

Reception 
Triangle was well-received by the audience ranking among the most-watched dramas on terrestrial networks during its two-month run. It peaked at a 10,3% nationwide rating on its last episode.

The drama was also pre-sold in Japan, China, and Thailand for a US$7 Million contract. It will be aired in the said countries in their native language.

In China, Triangle has exceeded 100 million views on Tencent; China's largest online video site, for its first 5 Episodes alone, becoming one of the most South Korean dramas in the country. Lead actor Kim Jaejoong's fan club in China has been broadcasting a total of 144 promotional screens at popular subway stations in Seoul since the 10th. It will be exposed for one month.

"Even If You Hate", an original soundtrack for the series, co-written and sang by Kim Jaejoong, took 2nd place on the Japanese iTunes OST chart and 4th place on the overall single chart upon release. Due to the success of the soundtrack, the singer also ranked #1 on Twitter's Hot Word and Celebrity charts while also trendig on the platform.

Ratings 
 In the table above, the blue numbers represent the lowest ratings and the red numbers represent the highest ratings.
NR denotes that the drama did not rank in the top 20 daily programs on that date

Awards and nominations

International broadcast

References

External links
 
Triangle at MBC Global Media

MBC TV television dramas
2014 South Korean television series debuts
2014 South Korean television series endings
Korean-language television shows
South Korean action television series
South Korean melodrama television series
Television shows written by Choi Wan-kyu